Euchordodes is a genus of worms belonging to the family Chordodidae.

The species of this genus are found in New Zealand.

Species:

Euchordodes libellulovivens 
Euchordodes malayensis 
Euchordodes malaysiensis 
Euchordodes nigromaculatus 
Euchordodes parvulus

References

Nematomorpha